Guseo Station is a station of the Busan Metro Line 1 in Guseo-dong, Geumjeong District, Busan, South Korea.

Station Layout

External links
  Cyber station information from Busan Transportation Corporation

Busan Metro stations
Geumjeong District
Railway stations in South Korea opened in 1985